Kumar Waii is an Indian politician from the state of Arunachal Pradesh.

Waii was elected from the Bameng seat in the 2014 Arunachal Pradesh Legislative Assembly election, standing as an Indian National Congress candidate. He served as the Minister of Home and Urban Development of Arunachal Pradesh in the previous government(2014-2019).

See also
Arunachal Pradesh Legislative Assembly

References

External links
Kumar Waii profile

People's Party of Arunachal politicians
Indian National Congress politicians
Living people
Bharatiya Janata Party politicians from Arunachal Pradesh
Arunachal Pradesh MLAs 2014–2019
State cabinet ministers of Arunachal Pradesh
Year of birth missing (living people)
National People's Party (India) politicians